The Oxford Green Belt is a green belt environmental and planning policy that regulates the rural space in Oxfordshire, within the South East region of England. It is centred on the city of Oxford, along with surrounding areas. Its core function is to control urban growth and development in and around the Oxford built-up area. It is managed by the local planning authorities on basis of guidance from central government.

Geography
The green belt was first proposed in 1958, but only formalised and approved by central government in 1975. All the Oxfordshire district council areas contain some portion, and it extends for some five miles from the city's limits. The smallest tracts are within the city and West Oxfordshire districts, with South Oxfordshire containing the largest expanse.

Key suburbs, villages and towns within the realms of the green belt include Dean Court, Kennington, Kidlington, Wheatley, and Yarnton. Landscape features and facilities within include River Thames, Cherwell and their flood-meadows, RSPB Otmoor, Culham Science Centre, Cutteslowe Park and the mini railway attraction, Shotover Country Park, Farmoor Reservoir, and St Margaret's Church and well. Due to the belt lying wholly within the county border, responsibility and co-ordination lies with the district councils as these are the local planning authorities.

See also
 Green belt (United Kingdom)
 Oxford Green Belt Way

References

External links
 Interactive map of green belt land

1975 establishments in England
Green belts in the United Kingdom
Environment of Oxfordshire
Geography of Oxford